The following Union Army units and commanders fought in the Battle of Ball's Bluff of the American Civil War, fought from October 20 to October 24, 1861, in Loudoun County, Virginia, also known as the Battle of Leesburg or the Battle of Harrison's Island.  The Confederate order of battle is shown separately.

Abbreviations used

Military rank
 MG = Major General
 BG = Brigadier General
 Col = Colonel
 Ltc = Lieutenant Colonel
 Maj = Major
 Cpt = Captain
 Lt = Lieutenant
 Bvt = Brevet Rank

Other
 w = wounded
 mw = mortally wounded
 k = killed

Union Forces Around Ball’s Bluff and Edwards’ Ferry

Army of the Potomac

MG George B. McClellan (not present)

Corps of Observation
BG Charles Pomeroy Stone

References

Notes

American Civil War orders of battle
Loudoun County in the American Civil War